The 1984 Campeonato Nacional was Chilean football league top tier’s  52nd season. Universidad Católica was the tournament’s champion, winning its fifth title. The champion was decided by a small final tournament (Liguilla).

North Zone

Standings

Scores

Interzone

South Zone

Standings

Scores

Relegation play-off

Championship Liguilla

Topscorer

See also
 1984 Copa Polla Gol

References

External links 
ANFP 
RSSSF Chile 1984

Primera División de Chile seasons
Chile
Primera